Axel Julius Adolfrick Wiegandt (14 January 1888 – 28 February 1947) was a Swedish long-distance runner. He competed in the men's 5 miles at the 1908 Summer Olympics.

References

1888 births
1947 deaths
Athletes (track and field) at the 1908 Summer Olympics
Swedish male long-distance runners
Olympic athletes of Sweden
Place of birth missing